Bruce Lanoil (born July 5, 1960) is an American puppeteer who works for The Jim Henson Company and for The Walt Disney Company. He frequently works with puppeteer David Alan Barclay.

Early life
Lanoil was born in Brooklyn, New York, on July 5, 1960.

Career
Lanoil has worked as a puppeteer in various films and television shows since 1986. He performed the Cat in the Hat and Fox in Socks in the first season of The Wubbulous World of Dr. Seuss, he also worked as a puppeteer in The Muppets, Where the Wild Things Are, Dr. Dolittle, Jack Frost, The Flintstones in Viva Rock Vegas, and Cats & Dogs.

Outside of the Henson company, he was an on-set animation reference puppeteer and voice actor for the movies Monkeybone and Looney Tunes: Back in Action (as Pepé Le Pew). For Disney, he is also a voice double for Timon from The Lion King. He has voiced Timon in Kingdom Hearts II, Disney Think Fast, and Disney's Wild About Safety shorts. He has also performed a voice sample for an additional character in the 2011 Spyro game, Skylanders: Spyro's Adventure.

In 2017, Lanoil was an additional Muppet performer on The Muppets Take the Bowl. The following year, he was an additional Muppet performer for The Muppets Take the O2.

Filmography

Film
 Spaced Invaders - Pez (voice)
 Muppet Classic Theater - Additional Muppets
 Theodore Rex - Theodore Rex (face performer), Oliver Rex (face performer)
 The Adventures of Pinocchio - Principal puppeteer of Pinocchio
 Jack Frost - Jack Frost (in-suit performer)
 Can of Worms - Bom
 The Flintstones in Viva Rock Vegas - Puppeteer, character voices
 Muppets from Space - Additional puppeteer performer
 The Adventures of Elmo in Grouchland - Additional Muppets
 Monkeybone - Street Squash Raccoon (voice)
 Cats & Dogs - Mr. Tinkles (face performer)
 The Country Bears - Henry Dixon Taylor  (face performer)
 Looney Tunes: Back in Action - Puppeteer and voice of Pepé Le Pew
 Sid the Science Kid: The Movie - Bobbybot, Ira, and Zippa
 Where the Wild Things Are - Puppeteer
 Cats & Dogs: The Revenge of Kitty Galore - Puppeteer
 The Muppets - Additional puppet performer
 Muppets Most Wanted - Puppeteer
 The Happytime Murders - Additional puppet performer

Television
 Nanny & Isaiah series - Mrs. Fingle Beezer
 Popples - Puppet operator
 Perfect Strangers - Ventriloquist
 The Legend of Prince Valiant - Additional voices
 ABC Weekend Specials - Doc Peppers
 Dinosaurs - Charlene Sinclair (face performer), Les, Devil, Babysitter, Judge, Ed, UFO Host, Announcer, Shelly, Dr. Ficus, Walter Sternhagen, Larry, Stu, Mel Luster (face performer), Buddy Glimmer, various characters
 The Adventures of Timmy the Tooth - Sidney Cyclops, Big Dan, Mumfred's Father, Miss Sweetie, Kay
 Mr. Willowby's Christmas Tree - Bear, Owl
 The Wubbulous World of Dr. Seuss - The Cat in the Hat, Fox in Socks, Captain Zauber, Additional Muppets
 Muppets on Wheels - Lindy, Semi Truck Driver
 Aliens in the Family - Puppeteer
 Muppets Tonight - Swiss Cheese, Additional Muppets
 Family Guy - Additional voices
 Studio DC: Almost Live - Additional Muppets
 Teeny Tiny Dogs - Dinky (voice)
 Good Luck Charlie - Additional puppet performer
 No, You Shut Up! - Matt Rosenberg
 Lady Gaga & the Muppets' Holiday Spectacular - Additional puppet performer
 Grid Smasher - Additional puppeteer
 Oscar's Hotel for Fantastical Creatures - Ginger Root
 The Muppets - Additional puppet performer
 Mr. Neighbor's House - Officer Policecop, Demon #3
 Bob the Builder - Additional voices (US Dub)

Video games
 Ys: Book 1&2 - Luta Gemma
 The Nightmare Before Christmas: Oogie's Revenge - Additional voices
 Kingdom Hearts II - Timon
 Kingdom Hearts II: Final Mix+ - Timon
 Disney Th!nk Fast - Timon
 Skylanders: Spyro's Adventure - Additional voices

References

External links
Personal website

Living people
American puppeteers
Muppet performers
Sesame Street Muppeteers
American male voice actors
American male video game actors
1960 births